Sulphur Emissions Reduction Protocol may refer to:

1985 Helsinki Protocol on the Reduction of Sulphur Emissions
1994 Oslo Protocol on Further Reduction of Sulphur Emissions